Keserwan-Jbeil is the most recently created governorate of Lebanon. It consists of the districts of Jbeil and Keserwan. The capital is at Jounieh.

As of the end of 2017, the combined population of the districts of Jbeil and Keserwan was estimated to be 282,222. Maronites comprise a large majority of the population in the governorate, while Shiites are the next largest confessional group. In the 2018 Lebanese general election, Jbeil and Keserwan formed the Mount Lebanon I electoral district which was allotted eight parliamentary seats in total, seven Maronite and one Shia.

A proposal to separate the districts of Jbeil and Keserwan from Mount Lebanon Governorate was first submitted to Parliament in 2003. The new governorate was finally established by the gazetting of Law 52 on 7 September 2017. Implementation of the governorate began in 2020 with the appointment of its first governor, Pauline Deeb.

Jabal Moussa Biosphere Reserve is located in the governorate.

References

 
Governorates of Lebanon
States and territories established in 2017
2017 establishments in Lebanon